Judel Del (also Romanized as Jūdel Del; also known as Del Del) is a village in Shurab Rural District, Veysian District, Dowreh County, Lorestan Province, Iran. At the 2006 census, its population was 86, in 21 families.

References 

Towns and villages in Dowreh County